is a Japanese actress and singer. She had her first major voice acting roles in 2007, voicing Amuro Ninagawa in Kenkō Zenrakei Suieibu Umishō and Su in Shugo Chara!. She was named "Best New Actress" at the 4th Seiyu Awards in 2010 for her role as Yui Hirasawa in K-On! and Kana Nakamachi in Kanamemo, and received the "Best Lead Actress" and "Best Personality" awards at the 5th Seiyu Awards in 2011.

Her career as a musician began with her performance of the opening and ending themes of the anime series K-On! in April 2009. In the same month, she and three other voice actresses debuted as the musical group Sphere with their single "Future Stream". Later, K-On!s ending theme was given Animation Kobe's "Best Song" award. She released her first solo single "love your life" in October 2009, and has since released two albums and eleven singles that have placed in the top 20 of Oricon's weekly charts. She was awarded "Best Musical Performance" at the 4th Seiyu Awards for her performance on the K-On! mini-album Hōkago Tea Time with four other actresses.</onlyinclude>

Acting career
Toyosaki had her first major role as voice actor in 2007, providing the voice of Amuro Ninagawa, the main character of the anime series Kenkō Zenrakei Suieibu Umishō. She was then featured in Minami-ke and Shugo Chara! as Yoshino and Su, respectively. 

In 2008, Toyosaki reprised the two roles in Minami-ke: Okawari and Shugo Chara!! Doki—. She is also the voice of Charlotte in the new movie adaptations of Kentaro Miura's dark-fantasy manga Berserk.

She went on to voice Najimi Tenkūji in the 2009 series Akikan! and held the leading role in K-On!, providing the voice of protagonist Yui Hirasawa. She later took the roles of Koyoi Bessho, in First Love Limited, and Kana Nakamachi, the protagonist of Kanamemo. In Minami-ke: Okaeri, she reprised her role as Yoshino a second time. 

In 2012, she voiced Chiyuri Kurashima in Accel World, and title character Medaka Kurokami in the two seasons of the high school anime Medaka Box. In 2013, she voiced Kon, the main character's Familiar in Tokyo Ravens. 

In 2014, she voiced Seitenshi in Black Bullet, and was the third gender main character Izana Shinatose in Knights of Sidonia, which was also broadcast as a Netflix-exclusive series.

In 2017, she created the stop-motion anime short about the unicorn sponge titled Unicorn no Kyupi.

In addition to voice acting, Toyosaki has also appeared on camera. Her first acting job was on Shikoku Broadcasting's informational variety show  from 2003 to 2004. She, Ayahi Takagaki, Haruka Tomatsu, and Minako Kotobuki appeared twice on the  television show as the musical group Sphere on 20 April 2009, and 27 July 2009. During its run in July 2009, Toyosaki also narrated the show. At the 2010 Seiyu Awards, she was named as a "Best New Actress" for her role as Yui Hirasawa and Kana Nakamachi. At the 2011 Seiyu Awards, she won Best Lead Actress for her work in K-ON!! and Best Personality for her work on Radion!!, Pl@net Sphere, and Toyosaki Aki no Okaeri Radio.

In Animage's annual Anime Grand Prix awards, Toyosaki placed first overall for Best Voice Actor in 2009. Her character Yui Hirasawa also placed first overall among Best Characters. She would also place tenth overall in 2012 and eighth overall in 2014.

Musical career
Toyosaki's first musical performance was with fellow voice actress Eri Kitamura on the  image song CD on 23 April 2008. She then performed the opening and ending themes of the 2009 anime series K-On!, "Cagayake! Girls" and "Don't say 'lazy'", respectively, with voice actresses Yōko Hikasa, Satomi Satō, and Minako Kotobuki. Both themes were released as singles on 22 April 2009. The "Cagayake! Girls" single sold about 62,000 copies during its debut week, ranking fourth on Oricon's latest weekly singles chart, while the "Don't say 'lazy' " single sold about 67,000 copies during its debut week, placing second on the chart. The opening and ending singles remained on the chart during the week of 27 April to 3 May, falling to sixth and fifth, while selling an additional 19,963 and 22,094 copies. On 23 June 2009, "Don't say 'lazy'" was awarded Animation Kobe's "Best Song" award.

Toyosaki then performed the opening theme of the 2009 First Love Limited series, titled "Future Stream" with Ayahi Takagaki, Haruka Tomatsu, and Minako Kotobuki. Shortly after, the four formed the musical group Sphere. They are affiliated with Music Ray'n, an artist management and publishing group of Sony Music Entertainment Japan. The theme was released as the group's first single on 22 April 2009.

Toyosaki, Hikasa, Satō, and Kotobuki performed the insert song, a song that occurs within the episodes of the anime, "Fuwa Fuwa Time" for K-On!. It was released as a single on 20 May 2009. On 17 June 2009, Toyosaki released a K-On! image song single named after her K-On! character Yui Hirasawa. The single ranked third on Oricon's weekly singles chart during the week of 15 to 21 June, selling 31,384 copies.

Shortly after, Toyosaki, Kaoru Mizuhara, and Rie Kugimiya performed "Heart Connected to You", the opening theme of Kanamemo, which was released 5 August 2009. On 25 June 2009, she provided the narration of a television advertisement for the performance of "Blue Feather", a single by the musical group Binecks. The First Love Limited Character File Vol. 3 image album, released 23 July 2009, includes a song featuring Toyosaki. In July, the anime series Sora no Manimani debuted with the Sphere performed opening theme "Super Noisy Nova", which was released as a single on 29 July 2009. Toyosaki, Hikasa, Satomi Satō, Kotobuki and Ayana Taketatsu performed on K-On!s  mini-album released 22 July 2009. The mini-album sold over 67,000 copies to debut at the number one spot on Oricon's latest weekly album chart. It is the first album credited to fictional anime characters to do so. On 27 October 2009, Toyosaki released her first solo single "love your life". Sphere released their third single "It Raises the Wind/Brave my heart" on 25 November 2009. The group released their first album A.T.M.O.S.P.H.E.R.E on 23 December 2009.

After, the group performed the opening theme of Ichiban Ushiro no Daimaō, "REALOVE:REALIFE", which began airing in April 2010. The theme was released as a single 21 April 2010. Sphere next performed on the first day of Animelo Summer Live 2010, at Saitama Super Arena on 28 August 2010. At the 2010 Seiyu Awards, Toyosaki and her collaborators were awarded "Best Musical Performance" for their performance on Hōkago Tea Time. On 28 May 2010, Toyosaki released her second solo single, titled "Looking for Me". In July 2010, the Asobi ni Ikuyo: Bombshells from the Sky anime series began airing with "Now loading...SKY!!" by Sphere as its opening theme. The theme was later released as a single on 28 July 2010. In October, the Otome Yōkai Zakuro anime premiered with Sphere's "MOON SIGNAL" as the opening theme. "MOON SIGNAL" was released as a single on 20 October 2010, and "Junjō Masquerade" was released with the other endings on 24 November 2010. Toyosaki was the fourth top-selling voice actress in 2011.

Filmography

Anime

Film

Video games

Drama CD

Tokusatsu

Other dubbing

Discography

Solo singles

Solo albums

References

External links
  
  
  
  
 
 
 

1986 births
Living people
Anime singers
Japanese actresses
Japanese stage actresses
Japanese video game actresses
Japanese voice actresses
Japanese women pop singers
Musicians from Tokushima Prefecture
Voice actresses from Tokushima Prefecture
People from Tokushima (city)
Sony Music Entertainment Japan artists
Voice actors from Tokushima Prefecture
21st-century Japanese actresses
21st-century Japanese singers
21st-century Japanese women singers